Nasoona is a genus of dwarf spiders that was first described by G. H. Locket in 1982.

Species
 it contains seventeen species:
Nasoona asocialis (Wunderlich, 1974) – China, Nepal, India, Myanmar, Laos, Thailand, Malaysia (mainland), Indonesia (Bali, Java)
Nasoona chrysanthusi Locket, 1982 – Malaysia, Singapore, Indonesia (Sumatra)
Nasoona comata (Tanasevitch, 1998) – Nepal
Nasoona conica (Tanasevitch, 1998) – Nepal
Nasoona coronata (Simon, 1894) – Venezuela
Nasoona crucifera (Thorell, 1895) – India, China, Taiwan, Hong Kong, Myanmar, Laos, Vietnam, Thailand, Singapore, Malaysia (mainland, Borneo), Indonesia (Borneo)
Nasoona indianа Tanasevitch, 2018 – India
Nasoona intuberosa Tanasevitch, 2018 – Malaysia (Borneo)
Nasoona kinabalu Tanasevitch, 2018 – Malaysia (Borneo)
Nasoona locketi Millidge, 1995 – Indonesia (Krakatoa)
Nasoona orissa Tanasevitch, 2018 – India
Nasoona prominula Locket, 1982 (type) – Taiwan, Thailand, Laos, Malaysia (mainland), Singapore
Nasoona sabah Tanasevitch, 2018 – Malaysia (Borneo)
Nasoona setifera (Tanasevitch, 1998) – Nepal
Nasoona silvestris Millidge, 1995 – Indonesia
Nasoona sulawesi Tanasevitch, 2018 – Indonesia (Sulawesi)
Nasoona wunderlichi (Brignoli, 1983) – Nepal

See also
 List of Linyphiidae species (I–P)

References

Araneomorphae genera
Linyphiidae
Spiders of Asia
Spiders of South America